Pentti Ikonen (9 May 1934 – 24 March 2007) was a Finnish swimmer. He competed in three events at the 1952 Summer Olympics.

References

External links
 

1934 births
2007 deaths
Sportspeople from Vyborg
Finnish male freestyle swimmers
Olympic swimmers of Finland
Swimmers at the 1952 Summer Olympics